Fruit Rockers is a 2015 Chinese comedy film directed by Jian Wei and starring Linsheng Chen, Le Chang, and Daniella Wang. The movie won the "Recommended Domestic Feature Film Award." It was Jian's first big-screen work.

The theme songs of the three concerts in the film were also sung by director Wei Jian.

Cast
 Le Chang as Apple
 Daniella Wang	as Banana
 David Chen as Brother Zhen
 Linsheng Chen as Adam
 Yi Xu	as Durian
 Anastasiya Sedikova as Strawberry

References

External links
 
 Fruit Rockers at Douban

2015 films
2010s Mandarin-language films
2015 comedy films
Chinese comedy films